Cymbovula is a genus of sea snails, marine gastropod mollusks in the family Ovulidae.

Species
Species within the genus Cymbovula include:
Cymbovula acicularis (Lamarck, 1810)
Cymbovula bebae Fernandes & Ròlan, 1995
Species brought into synonymy
Cymbovula bahamensis Cate, 1973: synonym of Cymbovula acicularis (Lamarck, 1811)
 Cymbovula bratcherae Cate, 1973: synonym of Simnialena rufa (G. B. Sowerby I, 1832) 
 Cymbovula cylindrica Ma, 1997: synonym of Cuspivolva queenslandica (Cate, 1974)
 Cymbovula deflexa (G. B. Sowerby II, 1848): synonym of Naviculavolva deflexa (G. B. Sowerby II, 1848)
 Cymbovula guandongensis Ma, 1997: synonym of Cuspivolva queenslandica (Cate, 1974)
 Cymbovula massierorum Fehse, 1999: synonym of Naviculavolva massierorum (Fehse, 1999)
 Cymbovula segaliana Cate, 1976: synonym of Cuspivolva queenslandica (Cate, 1974)

References

External links

Ovulidae